"The Adventure of the Unique Dickensians" is a detective fiction short story by American writer August Derleth. It was released in 1968 by Mycroft & Moran in an edition of 2,012 copies. The 38-page chapbook is illustrated by Frank Utpatel. 

Of the Mycroft and Moran edition, 35 copies were bound in black cloth printed in gilt on the spine and front board, likely by collector/publisher Gerry de la Ree and distributed thus probably during the 1980s. The bound copies bear a label affixed to the inside front pastedown with a statement of the copy number, e.g. "#6 of 35 bound copies." 

The story is part of Derleth's Solar Pons series of pastiches of the Sherlock Holmes tales of Arthur Conan Doyle. It is a Christmas story about Ebenezer Snawley, an eccentric collector of Dickensiana who dresses in 19th-century clothing and is harassed by a man who bawls street cries near his dwelling.

The story was eventually collected in The Chronicles of Solar Pons.

Sources

1968 books
1968 short stories
Mystery short stories
Sherlock Holmes pastiches
Solar Pons
Christmas short stories